Siahkalrud Rural District is a rural district (dehestan) in Chaboksar District, Rudsar County, Gilan Province, Iran. At the 2006 census, its population was 5,986, in 1,845 families. The rural district has 18 villages.

References 

Rural Districts of Gilan Province
Rudsar County